TruckVault's Xtreme Hunts is a television series on the Versus Cable Network. It first aired August 1, 2008.

Overview
TruckVault's Xtreme Hunts is a blend of reality and extreme hunting. Each episode follows host Mark Kayser, portrayed as an average family man, undertaking the quest of extreme hunts across North America. Kayser hunts large and small game across harsh terrain and through inclement weather while providing tips on hunting, game calling, gear, physical conditioning and other topics.

The series also features a number of "Hero Hunts" to honor law enforcement heroes. Three heroes of law enforcement were selected to film with Mark and the crew as a give back for the tireless hours of public service our men and women of public safety put in. Mark Kayser invites these outstanding individuals nominated by their peers to join him on a televised hunt as a way of thanking them for that service. These hunts take place in South Dakota, Montana and Colorado during the season and feature some great pheasant, prairie chicken and waterfowl hunts.

TruckVault's Xtreme Hunts is filmed and produced entirely in HD by Orion Multimedia. In 2009 a production change has been made and Careco will be the new producer. It airs on the Versus Network in 2008 on Fridays at 3:30 p.m. EDT and Saturdays at 11:30 a.m. EDT.

External links
 Official website
 TruckVault home page
 Versus Cable Network home page

2000s American reality television series
2008 American television series debuts
2009 American television series endings